Sergey Kosilov is a Russian sprint canoer who has competed since the late 2000s. He won a bronze medal in the K-4 200 m event at the 2006 ICF Canoe Sprint World Championships in Szeged.

References

Living people
Russian male canoeists
Year of birth missing (living people)
ICF Canoe Sprint World Championships medalists in kayak